Verónica Saraí Mendoza Lara (born September 14, 1977 in Cuscatlán) is a judoka from El Salvador.

Career
Mendoza won the bronze medal of the under 70 kg division of the 2006 Central American and Caribbean Games.

She competed at 2007 Pan American Games in Rio de Janeiro where she lost in prelims with Mayra Aguiar who won silver medal.

Mendoza won bronze medal at the 2009, 2010 Pan American Judo Championships.

Achievements

References

 

1977 births
Living people
Salvadoran female judoka
Pan American Games competitors for El Salvador
Judoka at the 2007 Pan American Games
Judoka at the 2011 Pan American Games
Central American and Caribbean Games bronze medalists for El Salvador
Competitors at the 2006 Central American and Caribbean Games
Central American Games gold medalists for El Salvador
Central American Games medalists in judo
Central American and Caribbean Games medalists in judo
20th-century Salvadoran women
21st-century Salvadoran women